HMS Cambrian was a C-class light cruiser built for the Royal Navy during World War I. She was the name ship of her sub-class of four ships. Assigned to the Grand Fleet upon completion in 1916, the ship played only a small role during the war. Cambrian was assigned to the Atlantic and Mediterranean Fleets during the 1920s and was sent to support British interests in Turkey during the Chanak Crisis of 1922–1923. The ship was placed in reserve in late 1929. She was sold for scrap in 1934.

Design and description
The C-class cruisers were intended to escort the fleet and defend it against enemy destroyers attempting to close within torpedo range. Ordered as part of the 1914–15 Naval Programme, the Cambrian sub-class were a slightly larger and improved version of the preceding Calliope sub-class; Cambrian, the last ship of her sub-class to be completed, differed from her sister ships as she had a more powerful armament. She carried  tons of fuel oil. The ship had a crew of 368 officers and ratings.

Cambrians main armament consisted of three BL 6-inch (152 mm) Mk XII guns that were mounted on the centreline. One gun was forward of the bridge and the last two were in the stern, with one gun superfiring over the rearmost gun. Her secondary armament consisted of six QF  Mk IV guns, three on each side, one pair abaft the bridge on the forecastle deck and the other two pairs one deck lower amidships. For anti-aircraft defence, she was fitted with one QF  Mk V gun. The ship also mounted two submerged  torpedo tubes, one on each broadside. The walls of their conning tower were 6 inches thick.

Wartime modifications
During 1917–18, her pole foremast was replaced by a tripod mast that was fitted with a gunnery director. In January 1919, Cambrian had her 4-inch guns removed and an additional 6-inch gun added abaft the funnels. At the same time, her AA gun was replaced by a pair of QF  20-cwt anti-aircraft guns. Sometime between 1919 and 1924 the ship received a pair of 2-pounder (40 mm) Mk II "pom-pom" guns on single mounts.

Construction and career
Cambrian, the fourth ship of her name in the Royal Navy, was laid down by Pembroke Dockyard in Pembroke Dock, Wales, on 8 December 1914, launched on 3 March 1916, and completed in May 1916. She was commissioned into service that same month and was assigned to the 4th Light Cruiser Squadron of the Grand Fleet in which she served through the end of World War I and until 1919. The squadron was generally tasked with screening the battleships of the Grand Fleet during the war. The ship did not participate in the inconclusive Action of 19 August 1916 with the rest of her squadron. The squadron was briefly detached from the Grand Fleet in March 1917 to fruitlessly patrol off the Norwegian coast when news of a blockade runner was received by the Admiralty.

At the beginning of 1919, Cambrian was refitted in Rosyth before she sailed for Devonport where she was visited by the Edward, Prince of Wales on 13 June. The ship was assigned to the North American and West Indies Station the following month, where she served until 1922. Cambrians crew spent several days in August trying to tow off the schooner Bella Scott after she had run aground near Kingston, Jamaica and received a brief refit in Bermuda in March–April 1920. The Prince of Wales again visited the ship on 26 September in Dominica. On 25 January 1921, she was inspected by Vice-Admiral Sir William Pakenham at Bermuda and again on 17 June. The ship arrived at Plymouth, Massachusetts to participate in the Pilgrim Tercentenary celebrations on 31 July.

She was part of the 2nd Light Cruiser Squadron of the Atlantic Fleet from August 1922 until June 1924, and was detached to support British interests during the Chanak Crisis of 1922–23. She escorted the seaplane carrier  from the UK to Turkey from 27 September to 8 October and was later guard ship at Smyrna in December.

The ship was decommissioned in June 1924 and began a refit that lasted into 1926, during which her aft control tower and searchlight platform was removed, when she was recommissioned to serve in the 2nd Light Cruiser Squadron of the Mediterranean Fleet where she participated in a fleet exercise in March 1929. After transporting troops to China in 1929, she was decommissioned in November 1929 and assigned to the Nore Reserve. She was recommissioned as the flagship of the Nore Reserve in March 1931 and was then decommissioned in July 1933 at Sheerness and listed for sale. Cambrian was sold for scrap on 28 July 1934.

Notes

Citations

Bibliography

External links
Ships of the Cambrian class

C-class cruisers
Ships built in Pembroke Dock
1916 ships
World War I cruisers of the United Kingdom